Sciapteryx is a genus of insects belonging to the family Tenthredinidae.

The species of this genus are found in Europe.

Species
The following species are recognised in the genus Sciapteryx:
 Sciapteryx byzantina Benson, 1968 
 Sciapteryx caucasica Dovnar-Zapolskij, 1930  
 Sciapteryx circassica Dovnar-Zapolskij, 1930 
 Sciapteryx cleopatra Benson, 1954 
 Sciapteryx consobrina (Klug, 1816) 
 Sciapteryx costalis (Fabricius, 1775)
 Sciapteryx dovnari Ushinskij, 1940 
 Sciapteryx lactipennis Konow, 1903 
 Sciapteryx laeta Konow, 1891 
 Sciapteryx levantina André, 1881 
 Sciapteryx montana Dovnar-Zapolskij, 1930 
 Sciapteryx semenowi Jakowlew, 1886 
 Sciapteryx verticalis Muche, 1973

References

Tenthredinidae
Sawfly genera